Too Low for Zero (stylised as 2 ▼ 4 0) is the seventeenth studio album by English musician Elton John. Released in 1983, the album marked a comeback for John, whose previous four albums had failed to yield many enduring international hit singles, and had disappointing sales compared to his string of hit records released during the first half of the 1970s.

It is his second best selling album of the 1980s (after Sleeping with the Past), earning Platinum certification by both the RIAA and the BPI. It produced several hit songs, each accompanied by successful MTV music videos, and it spent over a year on the Billboard album chart.

Background
For the first time since Blue Moves in 1976, all lyrics were written by Bernie Taupin. John also reunited with the core of his backing band of the early 1970s: Dee Murray, Nigel Olsson and Davey Johnstone as well as Ray Cooper, Kiki Dee and Skaila Kanga (who played harp on John's self-titled album and Tumbleweed Connection).

Production
The album was produced by Chris Thomas and recorded at AIR Studios in Montserrat (the same studio for Jump Up!) and Sunset Sound Recorders in Hollywood.

For the first time since A Single Man, John played synthesizers in addition to piano, since James Newton Howard left the band. John felt that synths allowed him to write better fast rock songs, having not been entirely happy with such compositions performed on piano.

The album was written and recorded in approximately two weeks, with overdubs completed in a week.

Releases
The original LP issue of the album featured a die-cut cover with a special inner sleeve. The four shapes shown on the cover were cut out, with the colours (shown as ink smears on the inner sleeve) showing through the holes. The 2010 Japanese SHM CD release of the album is the only CD version to replicate the packaging of the original LP with the die-cut design.

All B-sides released on US singles from this time originate from his 1978 album A Single Man and the 21 at 33 sessions from 1980. They were also previously released on European singles. In the US, Too Low for Zero was certified gold in January 1984 and platinum in October 1995 by the RIAA.

Reception

Reviewing the album in Rolling Stone, Don Shewey commented, "Elton John and Bernie Taupin have written some great hit singles, but since the early Elton John LP, they have never produced an album of consistently first-rate material. And although Too Low for Zero is a big step up from losers like Blue Moves and A Single Man, it doesn't hang together, either." He praised the catchy energy of "I'm Still Standing", "Kiss the Bride", "Crystal", and "Too Low for Zero", and approved of the way those four songs synthesized the styles of popular artists such as The Pointer Sisters and Joe Jackson. However, he felt the rest of the album suffered from poor lyrics, finding the morbidity of "Cold as Christmas" and "One More Arrow" to be especially distasteful.

Track listing

 Sides one and two were combined as tracks 1–10 on CD reissues.

Personnel 
Track numbering refers to CD and digital releases of the album.
 Elton John – lead vocals, backing vocals, acoustic piano (tracks 1–5, 8, 10), Fender Rhodes (Track 1), synthesizers (Tracks 1–7, 9), clavinet (Track 9)
 Davey Johnstone – acoustic guitar (Tracks 1, 4, 5, 6, 9), electric guitar (Tracks 2-10), backing vocals
 Dee Murray – bass guitar, backing vocals
 Nigel Olsson – drums, tambourine on "Whipping Boy", backing vocals
 Ray Cooper – percussion on "Cold as Christmas (In the Middle of the Year)"
 Skaila Kanga – harp on "Cold as Christmas (In the Middle of the Year)"
 Kiki Dee – backing vocals on "Cold as Christmas (In the Middle of the Year)"
 Stevie Wonder – harmonica on "I Guess That's Why They Call It the Blues"
 James Newton Howard – string arrangements on "One More Arrow"

On bonus tracks 
 Produced by Elton John and Clive Franks
 Elton John – acoustic piano on "Earn While You Learn" and "The Retreat", organ on "Earn While You Learn" and "Dreamboat", Fender Rhodes on "Dreamboat", mellotron on "Earn While You Learn", vocals on "Dreamboat and "The Retreat"
 David Paich – Hammond organ on "The Retreat"
 James Newton-Howard – synthesizers on "The Retreat"
 Tim Renwick – guitar on "Earn While You Learn" and "Dreamboat"
 Steve Lukather – guitar on "The Retreat"
 Clive Franks – bass guitar on "Earn While You Learn" and "Dreamboat"
 Reggie McBride – bass guitar on "The Retreat"
 Steve Holley – drums on "Earn While You Learn" and "Dreamboat"
 Alvin Taylor – drums on "The Retreat"
 Ray Cooper – tambourine on "Earn While You Learn" and "Dreamboat", triangle on "Earn While You Learn"
 Paul Buckmaster – orchestra arrangements on "Dreamboat"

Production 
 Produced by Chris Thomas
 Recorded and Mixed by Bill Price
 Mixed at AIR Studios London
 Mastered by Chris Thomas (UK) and Greg Fulginiti (US).
 Management – John Reid
 Art Direction – Rod Dyer
 Design – Clive Piercy

Charts

Weekly charts

Year-end charts

Decade-end charts

Certifications

References

External links

Elton John albums
1983 albums
Albums produced by Chris Thomas (record producer)
Geffen Records albums
The Rocket Record Company albums
Albums recorded at Sunset Sound Recorders
Albums recorded at AIR Studios